The Van Daalen River is a river of Western New Guinea in the province of Papua, Indonesia. It is a tributary of Tariku River.

Geography
The river flows in the northern area of Papua with predominantly tropical rainforest climate (designated as Af in the Köppen-Geiger climate classification). The annual average temperature in the area is 21 °C. The warmest month is October, when the average temperature is around 22 °C, and the coldest is January, at 18 °C. The average annual rainfall is 5121 mm. The wettest month is March, with an average of 573 mm rainfall, and the driest is July, with 324 mm rainfall.

See also
List of rivers of Indonesia
List of rivers of Western Papua

References

Rivers of Papua (province)
Rivers of Indonesia